Trần Thùy Chi (born 4 May 1990), better known by her stage name as Thùy Chi, is a Vietnamese singer. She won the audience prize in the annual songwriting awards Bai Hat Viet (Vietnamese Song) at the end of 2008, then started a successful solo career.

Thuy Chi was born in 1990 in Hai Duong, Vietnam. Both of her parents work in showbiz or artistic endeavor in Hai Duong. When she was smaller Thuy Chi exposed her talents for music and later on, her family introduced her to the piano ever since she was six. Beyond nine years old, she began to travel to Ha Noi to study piano at the National Academy of Music of Ha Noi. 

Although she achieve her fame due to her online hits, Thuy Chi always had the intention to become a piano instructor.
Thuy Chi began to obtain Vietnamese community's attention with the release of the track "Giac Mo Trua" (composed by Giang Son). Starting from 2005, she, with Minh Phuong singer, won the prize in the contest named "Tuoi Doi Menh Mong" hosted by VTVT3 channel. The musical band TSD Band created by Thuy Chi và Minh Phuong acquired the greatest prize in the contest for high school and college students alike across the country in 2005. Based on the cover of "Giac Mo Trua" from Khanh Linh, Thuy Chi was appointed as the clone of Khanh Linh.

Thuy Chi reached her highest spot of fame when her songs were unofficially released on the internet. She had always been regarded as a singer with a powerful voice: she could hit the high note with much clarity yet retains certain sweetness in her singing. Online success helped Thuy Chi to attend at the even named "Bai Hat Viet" in 2005 organized by VTV4. Even though she became famous in showbiz and persuaded by her fans to continue her pursue the singing career but she regarded it as a personal interest and only wanted to follow her love for teaching the piano.

In 2008, Thuy Chi  received the prize for being one of the most favorite artists of the month from the show "Bai Hat VIet" with the songs such as "Thanh Thi", "Pho Co" etc.
At the ceremony "Lan Song Xanh" in 2009, Thuy Chi was awarded as one of the top ten artists of the year. 
In 2010, Thuy Chi and her Vietnamese orchestra won the silver medal of the world. In 2001, she and the Vietnamese band won the gold medal for their performance. 
In 2013, in Germany, her orchestra received the gold medal, and the Vietnamese child orchestra also won the awards for two performances: the most excellent performance and the fans' favorite. 
On December in 2013, at the live show "Bai Hat Viet", the community assessor decided to give the prize "song of the month" to the track "Pho trong mua," written by a young artist "Nguyen Anh Vu"  performed by Thuy Chi.
In the live show "Fans' favorite" in February in 2015, the prize of the month January was officially given to the song "Giu Em Di" given by the young singer Thuy Chi.

References

1990 births
Living people
21st-century Vietnamese women singers
Vietnamese idols
Vietnamese pianists
People from Hải Dương province
21st-century women pianists